S. R. Ramchandra Rao (16 September 1931 – 11 June 2017) was an Indian cricket umpire. He stood in one Test match in 1987 and three ODI games between 1983 and 1987.

See also
 List of Test cricket umpires
 List of One Day International cricket umpires

References

1931 births
2017 deaths
Place of birth missing
Indian Test cricket umpires
Indian One Day International cricket umpires